Pileggi is an Italian surname, and may refer to:

Arlene Pileggi (born 1966), American actress
Caroline Pileggi (born 1977), Australian weightlifter
Dominic Pileggi, American politician from Pennsylvania
Mitch Pileggi (born 1952), American actor
Nicholas Pileggi (born 1933), American author and screenwriter

Surnames
Italian-language surnames